The 1995–96 Chicago Blackhawks season was the 70th season of operation of the Chicago Blackhawks in the National Hockey League.

Offseason
Captain Dirk Graham retired. Defenseman Chris Chelios was named the new captain.

Regular season

The Blackhawks had the fewest power-play opportunities during the Regular season, with 356.

Final standings

Schedule and results

Playoffs

Player statistics

Awards and records

Transactions

Draft picks
Chicago's draft picks at the 1995 NHL Entry Draft held at the Edmonton Coliseum in Edmonton, Alberta.

See also
1995–96 NHL season

References
 

C
C
Chicago Blackhawks seasons
Chic
Chic